3/4 or ¾ may refer to:

 The fraction (mathematics) three quarters equal to 0.75

Arts and media
 3/4 (film), a 2017 Bulgarian film
  time, a form of triple metre in music
 3/4 profile, in portraits
 3/4 perspective, in video games

Other uses
 ″ videocassette, better known as the U-matic format
 March 4 (month-day date notation)
 3 April (day-month date notation)
 3rd Battalion 4th Marines, a unit in the United States Marine Corps
 Three fourths, alternative name for Capri pants